Attilio Micheluzzi (11 August 1930 - 20 September 1990) was an Italian comics artist.

Born in Umag, at the time part of Italy, Micheluzzi graduated in architecture and worked for several years in Africa. Returned to Italy in the early 1970s, in 1972 he started collaborating with the magazine Corriere dei Piccoli, often under the pen name Igor Arzbajeff.

Among the best known comics created by Micheluzzi, there were the science fiction series Roy Mann, with texts by Tiziano Sclavi, and the adventure series Petra Chérie and Johnny Focus.

The Napoli Comicon in Naples has held the Premio Attilio Micheluzzi (Attilio Micheluzzi Awards) honoring comics creators annually since 1998.

Further reading

References

1930 births
1990 deaths
People from Umag
Italian comics artists